Sorocephalus  is a genus containing 11 species of flowering plants, commonly known as powderpuffs, in the family Proteaceae. The name means “heaped head”. The genus is endemic to the Cape Floristic Region of South Africa, more particularly the winter rainfall zone of the southwestern Cape. The species are all small shrubs characterised by flower-heads containing clusters of four or more flowers. Most species are threatened.

Species
Described species are shown below, with their conservation status:

 Sorocephalus alopecurus Rourke – Woolly-stalk powderpuff – EN
 Sorocephalus capitatus Rourke – Woolly powderpuff – NT
 Sorocephalus clavigerus (Knight) Hutch. – Erect powderpuff – EN
 Sorocephalus crassifolius Hutch. – Flowerless powderpuff – CR
 Sorocephalus imbricatus (Thunb.) R. Br. – Lanceolate-leaf powderpuff – CR
 Sorocephalus lanatus R. Br. – Common powderpuff – LC
 Sorocephalus palustris  Rourke – Prostrate powderpuff – CR
 Sorocephalus pinifolius Rourke – Long-leaf powderpuff – EN
 Sorocephalus scabridus  Meisn. – Tulbagh powderpuff – CR
 Sorocephalus tenuifolius R.Br. – Diminutive powderpuff – EN
 Sorocephalus teretifolius (Meisn.) E.Phillips – Pin-shaped powderpuff – EN

References

Proteaceae
Proteaceae genera
Endemic flora of South Africa
Flora of the Cape Provinces